Leon Sapieha (1803–1878), sometimes written as Leon Sapiega, was a Galician noble (szlachcic) and statesman.

Biography
Leon was born and educated in Warsaw, and studied law and economics in Paris and Edinburgh from 1820 to 1824. He began to work in the administration in the Polish (Congress) Kingdom. After the outbreak of the November Uprising in 1830, he left Russian Empire and took part in diplomatic missions of the Polish National Government in France and Great Britain. After that, he returned and participated in the Uprising in the rank of an Artillery Captain, among others in the defence of Warsaw on 6 and 7 September. He was awarded for that the Virtuti Militari Order. After the collapse of the Uprising he settled in Galicia, then part of the Austrian Empire. In 1835 Russian authorities confiscated his estates in Congress Poland as punishment for his participation in the failed Uprising. Leon Sapieha was one of the leaders of the Ruthenian sobor.

He was a member of "National movement" circles and held contacts with the "Hotel Lambert". He became a member of the National Sejm (Diet of Galicia) in the Austro-Hungarian province of Galicia, member of the Austrian Council of the State and member of the imperial Herrenhaus in 1861. In 1863 he didn't participate in the January Uprising in Russian-occupied Poland, but contributed towards it financially. From 1861 until 1875 he served as Sejm Marshal. In 1875, he retired from political life.

During his career he devoted much energy to agitating for the development of railways in Galicia, believing this to be central to the development of the region and the lives of its mostly Polish inhabitants. In 1858 after years of struggling to secure support in Vienna for his plans he was able to initiate the construction of the Carl Ludwig railway line connecting the railhead at Kraków with Lviv and Brody and linking Galicia with the rest of Europe.

Legacy

In 1869, the city of Stanisławów (now Ivano-Frankivsk) named its street after him, ulica Sapiezinskego (now Independence Street), which carried its name until the start of World War II.

Bibliography
 Sapieha Leon, Wspomnienia z lat 1803–1863, Lwów 1914.

References

Notes

1803 births
1878 deaths
Nobility from Warsaw
People from the Province of South Prussia
Ruthenian nobility
Polish economists
Lawyers from Warsaw
Recipients of the Virtuti Militari
Marshals of the Diet of Galicia and Lodomeria
Leon Sapieha
Participants of the Slavic Congress in Prague 1848